Wellington Square is a neighborhood in Mid-City Los Angeles, California at the western edge of the West Adams Historic District.

Geography 
Wellington Square consists of four streets: Victoria Avenue, Wellington Road, Virginia Road, and Buckingham Road.  These four streets contain 209 homes of various architectural styles including Spanish Colonial, Tudor, Craftsman and French Norman.

The neighborhood is bordered by West Boulevard on the west, Crenshaw Boulevard on the east, Washington Boulevard on the north, and the Santa Monica Freeway on the south. The neighborhood is gated at West Boulevard and 23rd Street.

The neighborhoods of LaFayette Square and Victoria Park are located north of Wellington Square.

History 

Wellington Square was subdivided in 1912 by George L. Crenshaw and was developed by prominent real estate developer M.J. Nolan.  Nolan was a native of Syracuse, New York, and settled in Los Angeles in 1886.  In 1914, Nolan started to develop 90 acres of land between Adams and the new La Fayette Square.  He died in 1918, and the W.I. Hollingsworth Co. continued lot sales.  The boom years of the 1920s saw the peak of development of the neighborhood. Homes in the neighborhood are an architectural mixture of Craftsman and Revival styles of the 1920s and 1930s.

In 1955, construction of the Santa Monica Freeway began.  The first segment opened in 1961 and the freeway was completed in 1964.  The freeway was named by the State Highway Commission on August 14, 1957.  Because of the space needed for the Santa Monica freeway, many homes in Wellington Square were declared eminent domain and demolished by Caltrans to build the freeway.

Landmarks

On October 9, 2013, The Haight-Dandridge Residence, located at 2012 S. Victoria Avenue, was added to the list of Los Angeles Historic-Cultural Monuments. 
The house was designed and built by businessman George Washington Haight in 1908.  The two-story residence exhibits character-defining features of Craftsman Style and Period Revival architecture. In 1951, the family sold the home to actress Ruby Dandridge, mother of actress Dorothy Dandridge. It is Los Angeles Historic-Cultural Monument #1044.

Demographics

Wellington Square is a very diverse neighborhood with many residents from many backgrounds and cultures. The neighborhood consists of Anglo, African-American, Latino, Japanese, Korean, Chinese, Indian, etc. The median home price is $1.7+ million and rising.

Notable people
Lucius Allen
Dorothy Dandridge
Juanita Moore
Dorothy Donegan
Nick Stewart
Evelyn Freeman

See also
 Neighborhood history
 West Adams Heritage Organization

External links

References

Neighborhoods in Los Angeles
Mid-City, Los Angeles